Salem is an American supernatural horror television series created by Brannon Braga and Adam Simon, loosely inspired by the real Salem witch trials in the 17th century.

The series premiered on WGN America on April 20, 2014, becoming the network's first original scripted series. As the network's first and highest-rated series, it was renewed for a second season on May 15, 2014. A third season was commissioned on July 11, 2015 and premiered on November 2, 2016. On December 13, 2016, it was announced that WGN had cancelled the show after three seasons, with the final episode airing on January 25, 2017.

Plot overview
The series stars Janet Montgomery as Mary Sibley, a powerful witch who controls the Salem witch trials by exacerbating hysteria among the Puritans while executing her plan of summoning the Devil. Problems arise when her long lost love, John Alden (played by Shane West), returns to Salem, complicating Mary's plans. The show has prominent elements of Gothic romance.

Cast and characters

Main

Recurring

Production

Development
The series first appeared as part of WGN America's development slate in July 2012, under the title Malice. On June 4, 2013, WGN America bypassed the pilot stage and placed a series order for 13 episodes, under the new title Salem. On November 8, 2013, filming of the series began in Shreveport, Louisiana, on an expansive set reflecting 17th-century Massachusetts. On May 15, 2014, Salem was renewed for a 13-episode second season by WGN America. On July 11, 2015, Salem was renewed for a 10-episode third season by WGN America. It began production on January 21, 2016. In December 2016, a month after the third-season premiere, it was announced that the series had been cancelled. Its series finale aired on January 25, 2017.

Casting
Casting announcements began in October 2013, with Ashley Madekwe first cast in the role of Tituba. Seth Gabel was the next actor cast, in the regular role of Cotton Mather. Janet Montgomery and Xander Berkeley were cast in the lead role of Mary Sibley and the role of Magistrate Hale, respectively. Shane West later signed onto the series regular role of John Alden. Also cast was Tamzin Merchant as Anne Hale. Elise Eberle was later cast in the series regular role of Mercy Lewis. On the June 1, 2014 episode, Stephen Lang joined the cast in the recurring role of Increase Mather.

For the second season, Lucy Lawless and Stuart Townsend joined Salem in the recurring roles of Countess Marburg and Samuel Wainwright, respectively. Joe Doyle and Oliver Bell also joined the second season in regular roles of Baron Sebastian Marburg and Mary's lost son, respectively. During the third season, singer Marilyn Manson joined the cast in a recurring role as barber and all-around problem solver Thomas Dinley.

Music

The majority of Salem'''s score was composed by Tyler Bates. Bates selected "Cupid Carries a Gun", a song he co-wrote with Marilyn Manson and recorded by the band for their album The Pale Emperor, as the show's title track.

Episodes

Home media

The first season was released on DVD in the United States on October 28, 2014, by Fox Home Entertainment. The second season was released on DVD on April 5, 2016, and is manufactured by Amazon's CreateSpace MOD Program.

Reception

Critical receptionSalem scored 49 out of 100 based on 16 critic reviews on Metacritic, which the site characterizes as "mixed or average reviews". On Rotten Tomatoes, the first season scored 54% and an average rating of 5.5 out of 10 based on 26 critic reviews. The critical consensus reads: "While the horror scenes are well-executed, Salem lacks enough substance to sustain even a guilty-pleasure interest." Neil Genzlinger of The New York Times, upon reviewing the first season, said the show is "brash and well executed... perversely entertaining". He went on to say that "when Salem isn't being deliberately outrageous, it's cultivating a dynamic that could be fruitful as things move along. Here in the 21st century, science and reason rule, but in a world of sorcery, clinging to rationality just makes you stupid." Mark Dawidziak of The Plain Dealer gave the first few episodes a positive review, saying "Slowly drawing you into its heightened version of that Puritan community, Salem casts its spell with an opening episode that is a witch's brew of romance, fear, deceit, revenge, hysteria, evil and uncertainty."  Zack Handlin of The A.V. Club called the series "a collection of shallow stock characters and ramshackle plotting" that attempts tacky exploitation of a tragedy.  Brian Lowry wrote in Variety'' that although the series is not bad, it "plays like a rather flat supernatural soap".

Ratings

The series premiere rose to 3.4million viewers in Live+7 ratings, and had more than 1.5million viewers in adults 18–49. The season two premiere rose 150% in adults 18–49 in Live+7 ratings, from 0.2 to 0.5, while it rose to 1.5million viewers in Live+3. The second episode rose 300% from 0.1 to 0.4.

Awards and nominations

References

External links
 
 

2014 American television series debuts
2017 American television series endings
2010s American drama television series
2010s American horror television series
2010s American supernatural television series
Cannibalism in fiction
Fiction about the Devil
English-language television shows
Witchcraft in television
Television about magic
Salem witch trials in fiction
Satanism in popular culture
Television series based on actual events
Television series by 20th Century Fox Television
Television series created by Brannon Braga
Television shows filmed in Louisiana
Television series set in the 17th century
Television series about the history of the United States
Television shows set in Massachusetts
Television series about witchcraft
WGN America original programming
Gothic television shows